The Enchanted Floral Gardens of Kula, Maui is a botanical garden located in Kula, on the island of Maui, Hawaii.

The gardens contain over 2000 species of subtropical and tropical plants from around the world. The collection has an emphasis on fruit trees and flowering plants, including: hibiscus, orchids, and proteas. 

The Enchanted Floral Gardens are open daily Tuesday through Sunday, 9am to 5pm, with an admission fee. They are located at 2505 Kula Highway, mile marker 10,(Highway 37), in Kula.

Formerly known as the Enchanting Floral Gardens, it was closed for four years, reopening in 2017.

See also 
 List of botanical gardens in the United States

References

External links

Botanical gardens in Hawaii
Protected areas of Maui